Arnaud Margueritte (born 7 March 1973) is a retired professional footballer. He played as a goalkeeper. He manages FC Rouen in Championnat National 2, having been appointed as joint head coach on 30 May 2021.

References

External links
Arnaud Margueritte profile at chamoisfc79.fr

1973 births
Living people
French footballers
Association football goalkeepers
FC Rouen players
Chamois Niortais F.C. players
Louhans-Cuiseaux FC players
C.D. Nacional players
Ligue 2 players
Racing Club de France Football players
US Avranches players
Wasquehal Football players
Blois Football 41 players
FC Chalon players
Footballers from Rouen
FC Rouen managers